Avlağı can refer to:

 Avlağı, Kovancılar
 Avlağı, Osmancık